Pop'n Magic is a 1992 video game for the PC Engine Super CD-ROM². It is a puzzle game developed and published by Telenet Japan.

Development 
The game took only three months to complete.

Gameplay 
The gameplay is somewhat similar to Bubble Bobble and Don Doko Don.

The game features two characters, Pop and Magic. The two characters have the same abilities and do not differ in any way.

The game features character designs that resemble anime, as well as full animated cutscenes between worlds, with Japanese voice acting. The audio for the game is full CD audio.

Release 
The game was released on July 24, 1992 for the PC-Engine CD.

Reception 
Famitsu gave it a score of 18 out of 40. 

Consolemania gave it a score of 85 overall.

Consoles+ gave it just 27/100.

References

External links 

 Pop'n Magic - PC Engine Library

1992 video games
Japan-exclusive video games
Platform games
TurboGrafx-CD games
TurboGrafx-CD-only games
Video games developed in Japan